Sanhe is a town under the administration of Longjing City in southeastern Jilin, People's Republic of China, located along the Sino-Korean border west of North Korea; the nearest major settlement across the Tumen River (and the border) is Hoeryong in North Hamgyong Province. , it has one residential community and four villages under its administration.

See also
List of township-level divisions of Jilin

References

Township-level divisions of Jilin
Longjing, Jilin